Heterogametic sex (digametic sex) refers to the individuals of a species in which the sex chromosomes are not the same.

For example, in humans, males with an X and a Y sex chromosome would be referred to as the heterogametic sex, and females having two X sex chromosomes would be referred to as the homogametic sex. This arrangement is known as the XY sex-determination system.

Homogametic sex refers to the sex of a species in which both sex chromosomes are the same. For example, in humans, female is the homogametic sex, having two X chromosomes, while male, with an X and a Y chromosome, is the heterogametic sex. A converse example is in birds, where males are the homogametic sex, with two Z chromosomes while females are the heterogametic sex, with one Z and one W chromosome.

However, in birds and some reptiles, males have two Z sex chromosomes and so are the homogametic sex, while females, with one Z and one W chromosome, are the heterogametic sex. Platypus males are heterogametic while females are homogametic. Among the insects, Lepidopterans (butterflies and moths) have heterogametic females, but in Drosophila, males are the heterogametic sex. This arrangement is known as the ZW sex-determination system.

Heterogamesis can lead to reduced or absent meiotic recombination between the sex chromosomes, and in some species, this extends to the autosomes, a phenomenon called achiasmy. For example, most lineages of male Drosophila melanogaster flies are achiasmic, lacking recombination on all chromosomes, although females show recombination.

Heterogametic sex determination systems typically have an approximately equal sex ratio, with distributions of sexes conforming to binomial variance. However, in practice, some populations deviate from this expectation, in a phenomenon termed sex ratio distortion. Sex ratio distortion has been observed in mice, mosquitos, and other organisms and can be caused by meiotic drive elements.

See also
Haldane's rule, concerns hybrid speciation
Haldane-Huxley rule, concerns achiasmy

References 

Plant sexuality
Animal sexuality
Chromosomes